Nathan Buck (born 17 August 1989) is a Welsh rugby union player who played for Newport Gwent Dragons having previously played for Pontypool United and Cross Keys. His position is tight head prop.

Buck moved to Ealing Trailfinders 2014–15.

References

External links 
 Newport Gwent Dragons profile

Rugby union players from Abergavenny
Welsh rugby union players
Dragons RFC players
Living people
1989 births
Rugby union props